National Highway 315A (NH 315A) is a National Highway in North East India that connects Khonsa in Arunachal Pradesh and Tinsukia in Assam.

Route 
Tinsukia - Naharkatia - Hukanjuri - Khonsa.

Junctions  

 Junction with National Highway 15 near Tinsukia.
 Junction with National Highway 215 near Khonsa.

See also
 List of National Highways in India (by Highway Number)
 National Highways Development Project

References

External links 
 NH 315A on OpenStreetMap

National highways in India
National Highways in Assam
National Highways in Arunachal Pradesh